Ironopolia is a genus of moths of the family Oecophoridae.

Species
Ironopolia ebenosticta  (Turner, 1946)
Ironopolia neochlora  (Meyrick, 1883)
Ironopolia sobriella  (Walker, 1864)
Ironopolia stygnodes  (Turner, 1946)

References

Markku Savela's ftp.funet.fi

 
Oecophorinae
Moth genera